Sarah Amial Morrow (born 1969) is an American jazz composer and trombonist.

Early life
Morrow was born in Houston, Texas in 1969. She studied the clarinet before taking up the trombone at the age of 12. She began playing jazz at the age of 17 in high school; after graduating from Ohio University, she began to play in small jazz formations.

Early career
Morrow was the first female instrumentalist to become a member of Ray Charles's orchestra, joining in 1995. She then worked with musicians such as Bootsy Collins, Fred Wesley, Clyde Stubblefield, Dee Dee Bridgewater, James Spaulding, David Murray, Rhoda Scott, Pee Wee Ellis, and Ricky Ford. Morrow also toured with Dr. John as a bandleader, producer, arranger and conductor for several years.

Albums
Morrow's 2016 album Elektrik Air featured pianist Robert Glasper, drummer Chris “Daddy” Dave, bassist Derrick Hodge, and DJ Jahi Sundance.

Ske-Dat-De-Dat: The Spirit of Satch was produced and arranged by Sarah Morrow and Dr. John, and featured Bonnie Raitt, Arturo Sandoval, Anthony Hamilton, and The Blind Boys of Alabama.

Discography 
As a leader
  Green Light  2000 (RDC Records)
  Standards and Others Stories ...  2002 (Blue Cobra). With Jesse Davis, David Murray and Anne Ducros
  Sarah Morrow and the American All-Stars in Paris  2005 (O + Music). With Rhoda Scott and Hal Singer
 Elektric Air September 2007. With Robert Glasper, Derrick Hodges, Chris Dave and Jahi Sundance.

With Dr. John
 Ske-Dat-De-Dat: The Spirit of Satch 2014. With Dr. John, Bonnie Raitt, more.
 The Musical Mojo of Dr. John: Celebrating Mac & His Music 2016. With Dr. John.

As a sidewoman
  Tony Monaco  2001 (Summit Records)
  Anne Ducros  2002 (Dreyfus)
  Katy Roberts  2002 (Autoproduit)
 The Jungle Book [2016] [Original Motion Picture Soundtrack] 2017.

References
Ernest Barteldes , "Sarah Morrow: The American All-Stars In Paris", All About Jazz, July 12, 2006	.

Specific

American jazz trumpeters
1969 births
Musicians from Houston
Living people
21st-century trumpeters
Jazz musicians from Texas